The Orange River Colony was the British colony created after Britain first occupied (1900) and then annexed (1902) the independent Orange Free State in the Second Boer War. The colony ceased to exist in 1910, when it was absorbed into the Union of South Africa as Orange Free State Province.

Constitutional history
During the Second Boer War, British forces invaded the Orange Free State, occupying the capital, Bloemfontein by 13 March 1900. Five months later, on 6 October 1900, the British government declared an official annexation of the full territory of the Orange Free State, this in-spite of the fact they had not yet occupied the full territory, nor defeated the Free State forces.

The Free State government moved to Kroonstad during the early months of the war and its armies remained active in the field until the war's end. From the perspective of the Orange Free State, independence wasn't  lost until they ratified the Treaty of Vereeniging on 31 May 1902.

On the Boer side, the government was led by state president Martinus Theunis Steyn (1857–1916) until 30 May 1902, when he went on sick-leave and was replaced by general Christiaan de Wet as acting state president. On the British side, Sir Alfred Milner was appointed Administrator of the Orange River Colony on 4 January 1901, with Hamilton John Goold-Adams as lieutenant-governor.

Following the end of hostilities, Lord Milner visited Bloemfontein on 23 June 1902 and promulgated the new constitution, in the presence of military officials, heads of civil department and representatives of the late Boer government, including General De Wet. Milner was sworn in as Governor and Commander-in-Chief of Orange River Colony on the same day.

From 1902 to 1910, the colony was governed by a single governor:
 Alfred Milner, Viscount Milner, in office 23 June 1902 – 1 April 1905;
 William Palmer, 2nd Earl of Selborne, in office 2 April 1905 – 7 June 1907;
 Sir Hamilton John Goold-Adams, in office 7 June 1907 – 31 May 1910

Self-government

By 1904 sentiment was growing for some form of self-government. The Orangia Unie (Orange Union Party) was formally constituted in May 1906, after several months of preparation. A similar organisation, called Het Volk, had been formed by the Transvaal Boers in January 1905. Both unions had constitutions almost identical with that of the Afrikaner Bond, a former pan-Afrikaner political movement, and their aims were also similar – to secure the position of the Afrikaners in state and society. The chairman of the Orangia Unie was Abraham Fischer, leading politician of the pre-Boer War period and top diplomat of the Boer republics during the Second Boer War. Among the other prominent members were J. B. M. Hertzog, Christiaan de Wet and Martinus Theunis Steyn.

A second political party, the Constitutional Party was formed by a group of burghers content with British rule. Chairman of the party was Sir John G. Fraser, before the Second Boer War a prominent (pro-British) member of the Volksraad of the Orange Free State. The Constitutional Party had a strong following in Bloemfontein, but not outside the capital. The political programmes of the two parties were very similar, the real difference between them being the attitude towards British annexation and Afrikaner influence.

In 1905 Lord Selborne, formerly First Lord of the Admiralty, replaced Viscount Milner as high commissioner for South Africa and governor of the Transvaal and Orange River colonies. Selborne had come to South Africa with a brief to guide the former Boer republics from Crown colony government towards self-government. When Liberal Party came into office in Britain in December 1905 the process was speeded up, with the decision to give both the Transvaal and Orange River colonies self-government without delay. Selborne accepted the changed situation, and the experiment proved successful. He ceased to be governor of the Orange River Colony on its assumption of self-government in June 1907, but retained his other posts until May 1910, retiring on the eve of the establishment of the Union of South Africa.

On 7 January 1907 Selborne released a despatch, known as the Selborne Memorandum. It reviewed the situation in South Africa in all its economic and political aspects and was a masterly and comprehensive statement of the dangers inherent in the existing political system and of the advantages a political union offered. The document had a marked influence on the course of events and together with Selborne's conciliatory approach assisted in reconciling the Dutch and British communities of South Africa.

After the elections of 1907, the colony received self-government on 27 November 1907. Abraham Fischer became the first (and only) prime minister of the colony (in office 27 November 1907 – 31 May 1910). The first Legislative Assembly consisted of twenty-nine members of the Orangia Unie, five Constitutionalists and four independents. Fischer's cabinet consisted of:

 J.B.M. Hertzog, attorney-general and director of education;
 A. E. W. Ramsbottom, treasurer;
 Christiaan de Wet, minister of agriculture;
 Cornelius Hermanus Wessels, minister of public works

Fischer, besides the premiership, held the portfolio of colonial secretary. The first Legislative Council counted five members from the Orangia Unie, five Constitutionalists, and one independent member, in effect holding the balance.

Policies
In May 1908, the Orange River Colony took part in an inter-state conference which met at Pretoria and Cape Town, and determined to renew the existing customs convention and to make no alteration in railway rates. These decisions were the result of an agreement to bring before the parliaments of the various colonies a resolution advocating the closer union of the South African states and the appointment of delegates to a national convention to frame a draft constitution.

At the eventual National Convention, former State President M. T. Steyn took a leading and conciliatory part, and subsequently the Orange River legislature agreed to the terms drawn up by the convention for the unification of the four self-governing colonies in the Union of South Africa. Under the imperial act by which unification was established (31 May 1910) the colony entered the Union under the style of the Orange Free State Province. Fischer and Hertzog became members of the first Union government, while A. E. W. Ramsbottom became the first administrator of the Orange Free State as a province of the Union.

Demographics

1904 census

Population figures for the 1904 census

See also
 Orange River Sovereignty
 Free State Province
 Vicariate Apostolic of Orange River for the Catholic missionary history

References

WorldStatesmen- SouthAfrica

20th century in South Africa
States and territories established in 1902
States and territories disestablished in 1910
Former colonies in Africa
1902 establishments in the British Empire
Former British colonies and protectorates in Africa
1910 disestablishments in the British Empire
1910 disestablishments in South Africa